Lake Manyara Airport  is an airport serving the Lake Manyara National Park in the Arusha Region of Tanzania.

Airlines and destinations

See also

List of airports in Tanzania
Transport in Tanzania

References

External links

OpenStreetMap - Lake Manyara
OurAirports - Lake Manyara

Airports in Tanzania
Buildings and structures in the Manyara Region
Lake Manyara